Felicity Plunkett is an Australian poet, literary critic, editor and academic.

Biography
Felicity Plunkett is a writer of poetry, essays, and short stories, and a widely published critic.

She has a BA (Honours) and PhD from the University of Sydney and began her career as a university academic. She was poetry editor at the University of Queensland Press from 2010 to 2018.

In 2016, she wrote a lyric, Todesfuge, for composer Andrée Greenwell's album, Gothic.

She worked with composer Andrew Ford, writing "Respair" for his song cycle Red Dirt Hymns.

Awards and nominations
 ABC Radio National 2003 Short Story Competition for "Sleeping Like a Baby"
 Newcastle Poetry Prize, 2005, shortlisted for The Sea in a Sieve 
 Dorothy Sargent Rosenberg Prize, 2006 for October's Road and Inside Your Wardrobe
 Dorothy Sargent Rosenberg Prize, 2007, for Articulate; Stitching the Night; Learning the Bones
 Thomas Shapcott Poetry Prize, 2008, winner for Vanishing Point
 Anne Elder Award, 2009, commended for Vanishing Point
 Josephine Ulrick Literature Prize, 2010, commended for Ruined Girls
 Western Australian Premier's Book Awards (Poetry), 2010, shortlisted for Vanishing Point
 Arts ACT Judith Wright Prize, 2010, commended for Vanishing Point
Nillumbik Ekphrasis Poetry Award, 2014, for Lost Sea Voices
Newcastle Poetry Prize, 2014, shortlisted for Glass Letters
Newcastle Poetry Prize, 2015, shortlisted for Songs in a Red Key and On carrying: seven cledons
Montreal International Poetry Prize, 2015, shortlisted for What the Sea Remembers
Montreal International Poetry Prize, 2017, shortlisted for Syzygy (Scrabble with Ivy)
Newcastle Poetry Prize, 2017, shortlisted for 13 Uses for a Poem 
Australian Catholic University Poetry Prize, 2018, for Sound Bridge
University of Canberra VC International Poetry Prize, 2018, shortlisted for Carpus Diem
Woollahra Digital Literary Award, 2021, non-fiction, shortlisted for True to Form: A.E. Stallings, Jenny Xie, Ada Límon
Woollahra Digital Literary Award, 2022, non-fiction, shortlisted for Plath Traps

Selected publications

Poetry collections
 
 Plunkett, Felicity (2011). Seastrands 
 Plunkett, Felicity (2020). A Kinder Sea

Anthologies (editor)

Thirty Australian Poets, University of Queensland Press, 2011)
States of Poetry Queensland (ABR, 2016) 
States of Poetry Queensland (ABR, 2017)

Anthologies (contributor)
 Skylines: New Writing From New England (2000) 
 Calyx: 30 Contemporary Australian Poets (Paper Bark Press. 2001) 
 The Best Australian Poems (Black Inc 2008). Edited by Peter Rose. 
 Best Australian Poetry 2008 (University of Queensland Press 2008). Edited by David Brooks. 
 The Best Australian Poems 2009 (Black Inc. 2009). Edited by Robert Adamson. 
 The Puncher and Wattman Anthology of Australian Poetry. Ed. John Leonard. (Sydney: Puncher & Wattman, 2010
 The Best Australian Poems 2011 (Black Inc. 2011). Edited by John Tranter. 
Global Poetry Anthology 2015 (Véhicule Press. 2015) Edited by Gabeba Baderoon, Kate Clanchy, Carolyn Forché, Amanda Jernigan, Anthony Lawrence, Niyi Osundare, Jennifer Rahim, K. Satchidanandan, Michael Schmidt, Bruce Taylor. 
Global Poetry Anthology 2017 (Véhicule Press. 2017) Edited by Kim Addonizio, David Dabydeen, Vona Groarke, Susan Nalugwa Kiguli, Arvind Krishna Mehrotra, Pascale Petit, Talya Rubin, Carmine Starnino, Mark Tredinnick, Joseph Akawu Ushie. 
The Turnrow Anthology of Contemporary Australian Poetry. Ed. John Kinsella (Louisiana: Desperation Press/Turnrow Books, 2014).
Best of Australian Poems 2021. Ed. Ellen van Neerven and Toby Fitch. (Melbourne: Australian Poetry, 2021).
The Language in My Tongue: An Anthology of Australian and New Zealand Poetry. Ed. Cassandra Atherton and Paul Hetherington. (USA: MadHat Press, 2022).

Essays
 'Plath Traps', Sydney Review of Books  
 'A mutinous and ferocious grace': Nick Cave and Trauma's Aftermath, Australian Book Review, 
 'Sound Bridges: a Portrait of Gurrumul', Australian Book Review,

Short Stories
 'Ruined Girls', Commended, Josephine Ulrick Literature Prize 2010, 
 'In the Shade': Review of Australian Fiction, Vol. 2, Issue 6, 
 'Sleeping Like a Baby': ABC Radio National

Book Reviews
 on

References

Australian women academics
Living people
Australian Book Review people
Year of birth missing (living people)
Academic staff of the University of Queensland